USA-288, also known as Advanced Extremely High Frequency 4 or AEHF-4, is a military communications satellite operated by the United States Air Force. It is the fourth of six satellite to be launched as part of the Advanced Extremely High Frequency program, which replaced the earlier Milstar system.

Satellite description 
The USA-288 satellite was constructed by Lockheed Martin Space, and is based on the A2100 satellite bus. It will be used to provide super high frequency (SHF) and extremely high frequency (EHF) communications for the United States Armed Forces, as well as those of the United Kingdom, the Netherlands, and Canada.

Launch 

USA-288 was launched by United Launch Alliance, aboard an Atlas V 551 flying from SLC-41 at the Cape Canaveral Air Force Station (CCAFS). The launch occurred at 04:15 UTC on 17 October 2018, placing the satellite in a parking orbit of 176 kilometers by 485 kilometers. A third and final burn, designed to minimize the amount of orbit raising required by the satellite, placed AEHF-4 in a 12.8° inclination orbit with a perigee of 8,914 kilometers and an apogee of 35,300 kilometers. The satellite was successfully deployed in this orbit about three and a half hours after launch.

See also 

 2018 in spaceflight

References 

USA satellites
Spacecraft launched in 2018
Spacecraft launched by Atlas rockets